Eight ships of the Royal Netherlands Navy have been named HNLMS Evertsen, after a family from Zeeland with many sea heroes:
Admiral Evertsen (1803–1814), cannon schooner;
Admiral Evertsen (1808–1819), ship-of-the-line;
 , frigate with additional steam power, renamed Neptunus (Neptune);
 , armored ship;
  (1926–1942), torpedo-boat destroyer;
  (1946–1962), ex-Scourge, torpedo-boat destroyer;
  (1967–1989), ;
  (2005– ), .

References

Royal Netherlands Navy ship names